The Terrible was a 110-gun ship of the line of the French Navy, lead ship of  her class.

Career 
In 1780, she was under Chateauvert.

In 1783, she took part in a Franco-Spanish fleet assembled before Cádiz under Admiral d'Estaing, but the end of the American War of Independence occurred before it saw action.

She took part in the Bataille du 13 prairial an 2, where she was dismasted by HMS Royal Sovereign. She later took part in the campaign of Winter 1794–1795, and in the Cruise of Bruix.

She was decommissioned in 1802, condemned in May 1804, and eventually broken up in October.

Sources and references

Notes

References

Bibliography 
 
  (1671-1870)
 

Ships of the line of the French Navy
Ships built in France
Terrible-class ships of the line
1780 ships